Nitassinan: The Innu Struggle to Reclaim Their Homeland is a non-fiction book, written by Canadian writer Marie Wadden, first published in December 1991 by Douglas & McIntyre. In the book, the author chronicles the plight of the Innu people, indigenous inhabitants of an area they affectionately call "Nitassinan" which means "our land" in the Innu language.

Awards and honours
Nitassinan received the 1992 "Edna Staebler Award for Creative Non-Fiction". The author has written a second book entitled "Where the Pavement Ends, the Aboriginal Recovery Movement and the Urgent Need for Reconciliation", published in 2008 by Douglas & McIntyre and nominated for three awards, including the Shaughnessy Cohen Award for Political Writing.

See also
List of Edna Staebler Award recipients

References

External links
Douglas & McIntyre, Marie Wadden, Retrieved 19 November 2012

1991 non-fiction books
Books about indigenous peoples
Canadian non-fiction books
Douglas & McIntyre books
Innu culture
Works about Indigenous people in Canada